Pierpoint is a census-designated place (CDP) in Tulare County, California, United States. The 2010 United States census reported Pierpoint's population was 52.

Geography
According to the United States Census Bureau, the CDP covers an area of 0.4 square miles (1.1 km), all of it land.

Demographics
At the 2010 census Pierpoint had a population of 52. The racial makeup of Pierpoint was 51 (98.1%) White, 0 (0.0%) African American, 0 (0.0%) Native American, 0 (0.0%) Asian, 0 (0.0%) Pacific Islander, 1 (1.9%) from other races, and 0 (0.0%) from two or more races. Hispanic or Latino of any race were 1 people (1.9%).

The whole population lived in households, no one lived in non-institutionalized group quarters and no one was institutionalized.

There were 26 households, 3 (11.5%) had children under the age of 18 living in them, 16 (61.5%) were opposite-sex married couples living together, 3 (11.5%) had a female householder with no husband present, 0 (0%) had a male householder with no wife present.  There were 0 (0%) unmarried opposite-sex partnerships, and 1 (3.8%) same-sex married couples or partnerships. 7 households (26.9%) were one person and 2 (7.7%) had someone living alone who was 65 or older. The average household size was 2.00.  There were 19 families (73.1% of households); the average family size was 2.32.

The age distribution was 6 people (11.5%) under the age of 18, 1 people (1.9%) aged 18 to 24, 8 people (15.4%) aged 25 to 44, 24 people (46.2%) aged 45 to 64, and 13 people (25.0%) who were 65 or older.  The median age was 56.5 years. For every 100 females, there were 85.7 males.  For every 100 females age 18 and over, there were 76.9 males.

There were 83 housing units at an average density of 203.5 per square mile, of the occupied units 20 (76.9%) were owner-occupied and 6 (23.1%) were rented. The homeowner vacancy rate was 4.8%; the rental vacancy rate was 14.3%.  39 people (75.0% of the population) lived in owner-occupied housing units and 13 people (25.0%) lived in rental housing units.

References

Census-designated places in Tulare County, California
Census-designated places in California